Cheng Siyuan (September 17, 1908 – July 28, 2005) was a Chinese male politician, who served as the vice chairperson of the Chinese People's Political Consultative Conference.

References 

1908 births
2005 deaths
Vice Chairpersons of the National Committee of the Chinese People's Political Consultative Conference